Dit da jow (pinyin: Diē dǎ jiǔ) is a common Chinese liniment used as traditional medicine in the belief it can reduce the pain from external injuries.

Description
Dit da jow  thought to be an analgesic liniment preferred by martial artists  is made from herbs put in a glass or polyethylene terephthalate plastic jar and mixed with an alcohol, such as vodka or gin.

Typical ingredients
The herbs and other ingredients are typically coarse-ground, then steeped in alcohol (vodka or rice wine
is common), sometimes with heat, and then aged.

Traditional ingredients

Traditional recipes may include:
 baji tian (morinda root)
  (stemona)
 baidou kou (white cardamom)
 baihuashe (pit viper)
 baiji zi (mustard seed)
  (white peony, Paeonia lactiflora)
 baizhi (white angelica)
 banxia (Pinellia)
  (black Atractylodes)
  (Aconitum kusnezoffii, a member of the large aconitum genus)
 cheqian zi (cooking plantain seed)
 chenpi (aged citrus peel)
 chenxiang (Aquilaria wood)
 chishao (Paeonia lactiflora, red peony)
 chuanpo shi (Maclura tricuspidata)
 chuanshan long (Dioscorea polystachya, Chinese yam)
 chuanwu (Aconitum carmichaelii)
 chuanxiong (ligusticum root)
  (rhubarb)
 danshen (salvia)
 danggui (angelica root)
 danggui wei (angelica root tail)
 digupi (lycium bark)
 dingxiang (clove bud)
  (angelica pub)
 duzhong (eucommia bark)
 ezhu (Curcuma zedoaria)
 fangfeng (siler root)
 fuhai shi (pumice)
 fuling (perenniporia)
  (raspberry fruit)
 fuzi (Aconitum)
 gancao (glycyrrhiza uralensis)
 ganjiang (ginger root)
 gaoliang jiang (galangal rhizome)
 gegen (kudzu root)
 gouqi zi (lycium berry)
 gusuibu (drynaria)
 guileren (trichosanthes seed)
 guizhi (cinnamon)
 haifeng teng (kadsura stem)
 hong hua (carthamus/safflower)
 hua jiao (prickly ash pepper or sichuan pepper(?))
 huang bai (phellodendron)
 huang qin (skullcap)
 ji xue teng (millettia)
 jiang huang (turmeric)
 jiang xiang (dalbergia rosewood)
 jie geng (platycodon)
 jing jie (schizonepeta)
 kuan jin teng (tinospora cordifolia stem)
 li lu (veratrum)
 liu huang (sulfur)
 liu ji nu (artemisia)
 long gu (dragon bone)
 lu lu tong (liquidambar fruit)
 luo shi teng (star jasmine vine)
 ma huang (ephedra) or gui zhi (cinnamon)
 menthol
 mo yao (myrrh)
 mu dan pi (mountain peony)
 mu gua (quince fruit)
 mu tong (akebia)
 mu xiang (Saussurea costus)
 niu xi (achyranthes)
 pu gong ying (dandelion)
 pu huang (cattail pollen)
 qian nian jian (homalomena)
 qiang huo (Hansenia weberbauerianano, syn. Notopterygium incisum)
 qin jian (gentian root)
 qing pi (citrus peel)
 rou cong rong (cistanche)
 rou gui (cinnamon bark)
 ru xiang (frankincense)
 san leng (sparganium or bur-reed)
 san qi (panax pseudoginseng)
 shan zhu yu (cornus berry)
 she chuang zi (cnidium seed)
 sheng di huang (rehmannia)
 shu di huang (cooked Rehmannia root)
 song jie (pine branch)
 su mu (Caesalpinia sappan)
 tao ren (peach kernel)
 tian ma (Gastrodia)
 tian nan xing (Arisaema)
  (Eupolyphaga sinensis, dried cockroach)
 tu si zi (cuscuta seed)
 wei ling xian (clematis root)
 wu jia pi (Eleutherococcus)
 wu ling zhi (mouse droppings)
 wu wei zi (Euodia fruit)
 xi xing (wild ginger)
 xiang fu (cyperus nut)
 xu duan (dipsacus root)
 xue jie (dragon's blood)
 yan hu suo (Corydalis)
 yu jin (turmeric tuber)
 ze lan (Lycopus lucidus)
 zhang nao (camphor)
 zhi ke (bitter orange peel)
 zi ran tong (pyrite)
 zi su ye (perilla leaf)
 zi wan (Callistephus root)

Westernized recipe ingredients

Some recipes instead use ingredients more readily available, such as:

 Arnica blossoms 
 Blessed thistle 
 Cinnamon bark
 Comfrey 
 Ginger root 
 Goldenseal root
 Myrrh 
 Pseudoginseng 
 Rhubarb root
 Sarsaparilla root 
 Witch-hazel
 Eucalyptus oil
 Rosemary oil
 Boswellia carteri
 Boswellia serrata

Analytics

Detailed information on the bioactive components of dit da jow is limited, with formulations varying widely. One report stated the components vary considerably with brand and age, but those found included acetic acid, acetoglyceride, columbianetin, coumarin, rhododendrol, vanillin, chrysophanic acid, and salicylic acid.

References

Traditional Chinese medicine
Drugs in China